La Magdeleine is a town and comune in the Aosta Valley region of north-west Italy.

Description 
La Magdeleine is a small ski resort featuring easy slopes, a nordic ski touring route and a snow park for children. It is also a launching base for hand-glider flights. At an altitude of 1644 metres, it is located on the left bank of the Marmore river, in the middle of the Valtournenche Valley. 

The centre of La Magdeleine is located in the hamlet of Vieu. 

The municipality features eight mills, powered by water from a small river, whose origins date back to the XVIII century. 

La Magdeleine is home to many chapels, including one built in the 1600s which is dedicated to Saint Roch, in the hamlet of Messelod. 

Paleontological remains found at a height of more than 2000 metres (on the slopes of Mont Tantané) suggest that this area was populated during the first Iron Age. In Medieval times, La Magdeleine was part of the Cly Dominion and was economically linked to Châtillon.

References

Cities and towns in Aosta Valley